Sean Clark (born 10 December 1980) is a Scottish former footballer who played as a defender for Albion Rovers and Livingston.

Career

Playing career

Albion Rovers and Livingston
Clark began his career at Albion Rovers and made one appearance before signing for Livingston in 1999.  His time at the Almondvale Stadium was just one season long, where he made 2 appearances.  One of those appearances was in a 2-0 win against Airdrieonians on 6 May 2000.  He assisted David Bingham who scored the opening goal.

Montrose and return to Albion Rovers
The defender struggled to break into a Livingston first team which was bolstered with seasoned pro's such as Brian McPhee, David Bingham and John Robertson.  He had a short loan spell at Montrose where he made 8 appearances during the remainder of the 1999-2000 season.

In 2000, Clark was brought back to his first club Albion Rovers by then manager John McVeigh.He made 22 appearances during his second spell for the Wee Rovers and left the club at the end of the 2000-2001 season.

Cumnock Juniors
Clark moved into the junior leagues and signed for Cumnock Juniors in 2001.

References

External links
Sean Clark on Soccerbase

1980 births
Living people
Scottish footballers
Scottish Football League players
Association football defenders
Livingston F.C. players
Albion Rovers F.C. players
Montrose F.C. players
Cumnock Juniors F.C. players
Footballers from Coatbridge